Pacollo (possibly from Aymara pä two (ä stands for a long a), qullu mountain, "two mountains") is a mountain in the north of the Barroso mountain range in the Andes of Peru, about  high. It is situated in the Tacna Region, Tarata Province, Tarata District. Pacollo lies northwest of Casiri Lake and northeast of the mountain Chontacollo.

References 

Mountains of Tacna Region
Mountains of Peru